Nizhneilimsky District is an administrative district, one of the thirty-three in Irkutsk Oblast, Russia. Municipally, it is incorporated as Nizhneilimsky Municipal District. Its administrative center is the town of Zheleznogorsk-Ilimsky. Population:  63,727 (2002 Census);

Administrative and municipal status
Within the framework of administrative divisions, Nizhneilimsky District is one of the thirty-three in the oblast. The town of Zheleznogorsk-Ilimsky serves as its administrative center.

As a municipal division, the district is incorporated as Nizhneilimsky Municipal District.

References

Notes

Sources

Registry of the Administrative-Territorial Formations of Irkutsk Oblast 

Districts of Irkutsk Oblast
